Independent Lens  is a weekly television series airing on PBS featuring documentary films made by independent filmmakers. Past seasons of Independent Lens were hosted by Angela Bassett, Don Cheadle, Susan Sarandon, Edie Falco, Terrence Howard, Maggie Gyllenhaal, America Ferrera, Mary-Louise Parker, and Stanley Tucci, who served two stints as host from 2012-2014.

The series began in 1999 and for three years aired 10 episodes each fall season. In 2002, PBS announced that in 2003 the series would relaunch with ITVS as the production company, under the leadership of Sally Jo Fifer and Lois Vossen, and would expand to 29 primetime episodes a year. The 2019-20 season is regarded as the 18th season for the series.

Independent Lens has won six Primetime Emmy Awards and 20 films have won News & Documentary Emmy Awards. In 2012, "Have You Heard From Johannesburg?" won for Exceptional Merit in Documentary Filmmaking; in 2007, A Lion in the House won for Exceptional Merit in Nonfiction Filmmaking; and A Lion's Trail won in 2006 for Outstanding Cultural and Artistic Programming. Three other films won for Best Documentary: Billy Strayhorn: Lush Life in 2008, Be Good, Smile Pretty in 2004, and Sing Faster: The Stagehands' Ring Cycle in 2000. Four Independent Lens films won News & Documentary Emmys in 2017 alone: The Armor of Light; (T)error; Best of Enemies; and In Football We Trust. As well, seven Independent Lens films garnered Academy Award nominations for Best Documentary: Enron: The Smartest Guys in the Room (2006),  The Weather Underground (2004),  Waste Land (2010), Hell and Back Again (2011), How to Survive a Plague (2012), I Am Not Your Negro (2016), and Hale County This Morning, This Evening (2018). Other awards conferred upon Independent Lens films include the George Foster Peabody Award, International Documentary Association Documentary Awards, Alfred I. duPont–Columbia University Award, and Sundance Film Festival Awards.

Episodes

Audience Award
Independent Lens gives out an annual Audience Award.  The TV viewing audience is invited to rate each episode of the series (through online voting), and an award is given to each season's winner. Winners of the Audience Award have included:

2003 Heart of the Sea
2004 Jimmy Scott: If You Only Knew
2005 On a Roll
2006 The Devil's Miner
2007 China Blue
2008 Na Kamalei: The Men of Hula
2009 Adjust Your Color: The Truth of Petey Greene
2010 Mine
2011 Two Spirits
2012 Strong! and Have You Heard from Johannesburg?
2013 The Revisionaries
2014 Don't Stop Believin': Everyman's Journey
2015 Kumu Hina
2016 Trapped
2017 They Call Us Monsters
2018 Unrest
2019 Out of State

See also
 POV
 Wide Angle

References

External links 
Independent Lens | PBS Web site
ITVS.org Independent Lens series page
Independent Lens blog
 

PBS original programming
2003 American television series debuts
2000s American documentary television series
2010s American documentary television series
Peabody Award-winning television programs
Documentary film series